Conioscyphascus is a fungal genus in the Sordariomycetes class (subclass Sordariomycetidae) of the Ascomycota. The relationship of this taxon to other taxa within the class is unknown (incertae sedis), and it has not yet been placed with certainty into any order or family. A monotypic genus, Conioscyphascus contains the single species Conioscyphascus varius, described as new to science in 2004.

References

Monotypic Sordariomycetes genera
Sordariomycetes enigmatic taxa